Jarabulus ( / ALA-LC: Jarābulus, Aleppo dialect: Jrāblos) is a Syrian city administratively belonging to Aleppo Governorate, under the de facto control of the Syrian Opposition. Jarabulus lies on the western bank of the river Euphrates. In the 2004 census, the city had a population of 11,570. The population has increased significantly during the Syrian civil war.

It is located north of Lake Assad, just south of the Syria–Turkey border and the Turkish town of Karkamış.

History 
In the Bronze and Iron Ages, the archaeological site lying just north of Jarabulus (half of which is now in Turkey) was called "Karkemish", in Greek and Roman times the ancient name of the city was "Europos" (Εὐρωπός), which must have been at the origin of the modern form of the toponym Jerabis.

The original 18th century form of the toponym seems to have been "Djerabis", later found however as "Djeraboolos" or "Djerablus", probably deriving from Hierapolis (modern-day Manbij, to the southwest).

Being on the southern side of the Istanbul-Baghdad railway, Jarabulus became a border town with Turkey based on the Treaty of Lausanne in the aftermath of World War I.

Following the outbreak of the Syrian civil war, the Syrian opposition took it over, along with its border post with Turkey on July 20, 2012. However from early July 2013 the town was controlled by the Islamic State of Iraq and the Levant. By January 2014, rebels mainly from the al-Tawhid Brigade engaged in clashes with ISIL and seized the town, but ISIL was able to recapture it within hours.

An article published by The Guardian said that attempts by the People's Protection Units (YPG) to capture Jarabulus were prevented by President Recep Tayyip Erdoğan, who, according to media reports, had threatened in 2015 to attack the YPG using the Turkish Army if they moved against Jarabulus. This threat secured ISIL control of the town.

Operation Euphrates Shield 

On 24 August 2016 around 4:00 AM (local time), Turkey-backed rebels and the Turkish Army launched a military operation into Syria. The operation was supported by the Turkish Air Force along with US-led coalition aircraft in an attempt to clear a passage for the troops. By 24 August, Jarabulus and neighboring towns were captured by the Syrian National Army. The SNA, backed by Turkish tanks, then connected Jarablus to al-Rai to push ISIL forces away from the Turkish border.

Demographics
Ethnically, the population of city is composed of Arabs and Turkmens. Turkmens belong to the Barak tribe.

Governance 

On 6 September 2016, the Karkamış-based council of Jarabulus that had been constituted 2 years prior, accused Turkey of attempting to replace them with a newly formed council consisting of pro-Turkish Turkmen separatists. The Sultan Murad Division denied the accusations and accused the local council of being PYD "collaborators", although it did confirm forming a "council of elders" in the city. Harakat Nour al-Din al-Zenki's political leader Yasser Ibrahim al-Yusuf, son of the perpetrator of the Aleppo Artillery School massacre, also said that the city would be governed by a newly formed council. The head of the Syrian Interim Government based in Turkey, Jawad Abu Hatab, has met with the Jarabulus local council on the same day.

Security 
On 22 January 2017, 450 members of a police force trained and equipped by Turkey were deployed in Jarabulus. The Jarabulus police is headed by defected Syrian Army brigadier general Abdel Razaq Aslan.

Education 
Following the capture of Jarabulus by the Turkish Armed Forces from the Islamic State, children returned to school, but are learning Turkish as a foreign language instead of French. In October 2018, the Gaziantep University opened a vocational school in Jarabulus.

Electric infrastructure
After the Turkish operation in August and September 2016, Turkish authorities planned the building of a  cable from Karkamış to Jarabulus in order to restore electricity in the city, with  being in Syrian territory. The electricity and potable water will be provided for free to the residents of Jarabulus.

On 26 September, following the visits of Turkish officials from Gaziantep Municipality including its mayor, Jarabulus was connected to the Turkish electrical power grid. A former school in Jarabulus was turned into a hospital and started servicing and was seen with an official Turkish sign reading "Turkish Ministry of Health - Jarablus Hospital" with a flag of Turkey.

Climate
Jarabulus has a hot-summer Mediterranean climate (Köppen climate classification Csa), with influences of a continental climate during winter, hot dry summers, and cool wet and occasionally snowy winters. The snow falls usually in January, February or December.

References

Populated places on the Euphrates River
Turkmen communities in Syria
Towns in Aleppo Governorate